Henry Dewell Moore (April 3, 1934 – January 29, 2023) was a professional American football defensive back/halfback who played in the National Football League. He played two seasons for the New York Giants and the Baltimore Colts.

Moore died on January 29, 2023, at the age of 88.

References 

1934 births
2023 deaths
Sportspeople from Little Rock, Arkansas
Players of American football from Arkansas
American football defensive backs
American football halfbacks
Arkansas Razorbacks football players
New York Giants players
Baltimore Colts players